The American Tobacco Company, South Richmond Complex Historic District encompasses a complex of tobacco storage, processing, and research facilities at 400-800 Jefferson Davis Highway in Richmond, Virginia.  Included in the  site are four large warehouses, processing buildings including a stemmery and a re-drying plant, and ancillary buildings and structures, including the American Tobacco Company's 1939 research laboratory.  The complex exhibits a historical range of trends in the processing and storage of tobacco.

The complex was listed on the National Register of Historic Places in 2016.

See also
National Register of Historic Places listings in Richmond, Virginia

References

Stemmeries
S
Industrial buildings and structures on the National Register of Historic Places in Virginia
Industrial buildings completed in 1911
Buildings and structures in Richmond, Virginia
National Register of Historic Places in Richmond, Virginia
Warehouses on the National Register of Historic Places
Tobacco buildings in the United States
Historic districts in Virginia